Add Insult to Injury is the fourth studio album by British electronic musicians Add N to (X).  It was released on 16 October 2000 by Mute Records. The album is essentially two mini-albums fused together, as half was written and performed by Ann Shenton and Steve Claydon, while the other half was written and performed by Barry 7, with occasional help from Dean Honer from The All Seeing I.

Early prints of the album came with 'scratch and sniff' panels (it smelt of grass), and stickers.

Track listing 
 "Adding N to X" (Claydon/Shenton) – 2:39
 "Brothel Charge" (Allum/Claydon/Shenton) – 3:02
 "You Must Create" (Allum/Claydon/Shenton) – 4:05
 "Kingdom of Shades" (Allum/Claydon/Shenton) – 3:47
 "Monster Bobby" (Barry/Honer/Smith) – 4:03
 "Poke 'er 'ole" (Allum/Claydon/Shenton) – 4:25
 "Plug Me In" (Barry/Honer/Smith) – 5:31
 "Hit for Cheese" (Allum/Claydon/Shenton) – 3:05
 "MDMH (Miami Dust Mite Harvest)" (Allum/Claydon/Shenton) – 4:24
 "B.P. Perino" (Allum/Claydon/Honer/Shenton) – 6:51
 "Incinerator No. 1" (Barry/Smith) – 5:33
 "The Regent Is Dead" (Barry/Honer/Smith) – 15:56
 "Violent Breath" (hidden track)

Adding N to X
Steve Claydon – Synthesizer, Bass, Cello, Keyboards, Vocals, Mellotron, Vocoder, Omnichord, Pedals
Ann Shenton – Synthesizer, Flute, Cello, Keyboards, Theremin, Vocals, Mellotron, Harmonica

Brothel Charge/You Must Create/Kingdom of Shades/Poke/Hit for Cheese/MDMH
Rob Allum – Synthesizer, Bass, Percussion, Drums, Pedals
Steve Claydon – Synthesizer, Bass, Cello, Keyboards, Vocals, Mellotron, Vocoder, Omnichord, Pedals
Ann Shenton – Synthesizer, Flute, Cello, Keyboards, Theremin, Vocals, Mellotron, Harmonica

Monster Bobby/Plug Me In/The Regent Is Dead
Barry Seven – Synthesizer, Celeste, Keyboards, Organ, Clavinet, Mellotron
Dean Honer – Arranger

B.P. Perino
Rob Allum – Synthesizer, Bass, Percussion, Drums, Pedals
Steve Claydon – Synthesizer, Bass, Cello, Keyboards, Vocals, Mellotron, Vocoder, Omnichord, Pedals
Dean Honer – Arranger
Ann Shenton – Synthesizer, Flute, Cello, Keyboards, Theremin, Vocals, Mellotron, Harmonica

Incinerator No. 1
Barry Seven – Synthesizer, Celeste, Keyboards, Organ, Clavinet, Mellotron

Violent Breath
Dean Honer – Arranger
Rob Allum – Synthesizer, Bass, Percussion, Drums, Pedal
Barry Seven – Synthesizer, Celeste, Keyboards, Organ, Clavinet, Mellotron
Ann Shenton – Synthesizer, Flute, Cello, Keyboards, Theremin, Vocals, Mellotron, Harmonica
Steve Claydon – Synthesizer, Bass, Cello, Keyboards, Vocals, Mellotron, Vocoder, Omnichord, Pedals

Personnel 
 Dave Williamson – Bass
 Joe Dilworth – Drums, Photography
 Rob Allum – Synthesizer, Bass, Percussion, Drums, Bass Pedals, Machines
 David Titlow – Photography
 Add N to (X) – Artwork
 Ann Shenton – Synthesizer, Flute, Arranger, Cello, Keyboards, Theremin, Vocals, Choir, Chorus, Moog Synthesizer, Producer, Mellotron, Korg Synthesizer, Mixing, Accompaniment, Arp 2600, Harmonica (Electric)
 Barry Seven – Synthesizer, Arranger, Celeste, Keyboards, Organ (Hammond), Stick, Clavinet, Moog Synthesizer, Producer, Engineer, Mellotron, Korg Synthesizer, Guitar Synth, Roland Synthesizer, Chords
 Steve Claydon – Synthesizer, Bass, Arranger, Cello, Keyboards, Stick, Vocals, Moog Synthesizer, Producer, Mellotron, Korg Synthesizer, Vocoder, Omnichord, Bass Pedals, Mixing, Throat, Accompaniment, Micro Moog
 Richard Hermitage – Management
 Ben Rymer – Vocals
 Dean Honer – Arranger
 Ross Orton – Drums

References 

Add N to (X) albums
2000 albums
Mute Records albums